Graft is a village in the Dutch province of North Holland. It is a part of the municipality of Alkmaar, and lies about 11 km south of the city of Alkmaar.

The village was first mentioned in the 12th century as Greft, and means "dug waterway". Graft developed in the 13th century on the former island of  after it had been enclosed with a dike.

The former town hall is a stepped gable building in mannerist style from 1613.

Graft was home to 458 people in 1840. It was a separate municipality until 1970, when it merged with De Rijp. In 2015, it became part of the municipality of Alkmaar.

Gallery

References

Populated places in North Holland
Former municipalities of North Holland
Alkmaar